Benzyl cinnamate is the chemical compound which is the ester derived from cinnamic acid and benzyl alcohol.

Natural occurrence 
Benzyl cinnamate occurs in Balsam of Peru and Tolu balsam, in Sumatra and Penang benzoin, and as the main constituent of copaiba balsam. It is used as an ingredient in the medicated cream product Sudocrem.

Synthesis 
Benzyl cinnamate can be prepared by heating benzyl chloride and excess sodium cinnamate in water to 100–115 °C or by heating sodium cinnamate with an excess of benzyl chloride in the presence of diethylamine.

Uses 
Benzyl cinnamate is used in heavy oriental perfumes and as a fixative. It is used as a flavoring agent.

It is used pharmaceutically as an antibacterial and antifungal.

References

External links
 Benzyl cinnamate at National Library of Medicine's Toxicology Data Network

Cinnamate esters
Perfume ingredients
Flavors
Benzyl esters